Bronco: The Series (Spanish: Bronco: La serie), is a Spanish-language biographical television series produced by Turner Latin America, Plataforma, and Comarex. The series is based on the history of Regional Mexican band Bronco, and in turn is an adaptation of the book Cicatrices de un corazón Bronco by José Guadalupe Esparza. The series is premiered on 24 September  2019 on TNT Latin America, and 3 October 2019 via streaming services on Claro Video. In the US, the series was released on Pantaya on 11 March 2021.

Plot 
Four musicians who start from nothing, try to earn a place in a heartless industry overcoming discrimination and poverty to reach the top. There they discover that on the road to success they lost the most valuable: the reins of their lives and the love of their families. The group will have to go down from the top to try to recover it.

Cast 
 Luis Alberti as José Guadalupe "Lupe" Esparza
 Yigael Yadin as José Luis "Choche" Villarreal
 Baltimore Beltrán as Javier Villarreal 
 Raúl Sandoval as Ramiro Delgado
 Luis Felipe Tovar as Homero Hernández
 Mayra Sérbulo as Ausencia
 Hernán Mendoza as Fermín Ordoñez
 Betty Monroe as Belén
 Martha Claudia Moreno as Conchita
 Michael Ronda as Eduardo
 Florencia Ríos as Martha Benavidez
 Pablo Astiazarán as Eric Garza
 Javier Escobar

Production 
The series is created by Julio Geiger, based on the book Cicatrices de un corazón Bronco, is produced by Julio de Rose and directed by Max Zunino, and Conrado Martínez who also interpret two musical themes in each episode of the series. To interpret José Guadalupe Esparza, Luis Alberti said he was inspired more than anything in his songs than in his book to know his personality. Betty Monroe plays Belén Mendoza, the first public relations advisor of the band that in real life was Blanca Martínez, La Chicuela. Yigael Yadin to play Choche, had to learn to play drums and also gain 22 kilos. He also confirmed that the series will not touch topics such as alcoholism, drugs, lawsuits or disunity.

The series was recorded almost entirely in Mexico, specifically in Mexico City, Nuevo Leon, and Hidalgo and another part in the United States.

References 

Spanish-language television shows
Television shows set in Mexico
Television series based on singers and musicians
TNT (American TV network) original programming
2019 Mexican television series debuts
2010s Mexican television series
Claro Video original programming
2019 Mexican television series endings